The Bankasoka River is a river in Sierra Leone.

As a tidal estuary (also called Port Loko Creek) it combines with the Rokel River to the south to form the Sierra Leone River.

Two ports are located on this river, Port Pepel and Port Loko.

References 

Rivers of Sierra Leone